Chamorshi is a Town and a tehsil in Gadchiroli district in the Indian state of Maharashtra.

It is located near the east bank of the Wainganga River, which along with Wardha River forms the Pranahita River at Chaprala which meets the Godavari River. It is famous for the ancient historic temple of god Markandeshwar which is located at village Markanda. Temple is situated at the bank of the Wainganga river, which flows generally from North to South but at Markanda it takes Northward turn for 20 km before again going Southward.Markanda is also known as (vidharbhachi kashi).
Every year at mahashivratri there is Mela or fair at markanda.
Which last for 10 days.
There is also a chicdoh barrage near to chamorshi which has more than 35 gates, which is also a major attraction of this town.
There is also mutnur 30km from chamorshi now a day it has famous tourist attraction for vidharbha people. Mutnur is small hill station.

Geography
Charmoshi has an average elevation of 182 metres (600 feet).

See also
Ashti, Gadchiroli

References

Cities and towns in Gadchiroli district
Talukas in Maharashtra